The  Washington Commandos season was the third and final season for the Commandos. The team returned to the Washington name for their final season in 1990. They were coached by Hohensee, who had been promoted from his assistant position. The Commandos started the season 0–3. They finished with a record of 2–6.

Regular season

Schedule

Standings

y – clinched regular-season title

x – clinched playoff spot

Roster

All-Arena team members

References

Washington Commandos
Washington Commandos
Washington Commandos seasons